India Stack refers to the ambitious project of creating a unified software platform to bring India's population into the digital age. Its website describes its mission thus: "India Stack is a set of APIs that allows governments, businesses, startups and developers to utilize a unique digital Infrastructure to solve India’s hard problems towards presence-less, paperless, and cashless service delivery" Of the four "distinct technology layers" mentioned on the same page, the first, the "Presenceless Layer" is the most controversial as it involves storing biometric data such as fingerprints for every citizen. Since such markers are widely being adopted to enable cashless payment, the issue arises of fraudulent use of biometrics. The other layers are the Paperless Layer, which enables personal records to be associated with one's online identity; the Cashless Layer, a single interface to all national banks and online wallets; and the Consent Layer, which aims to maintain security and control of personal data.

India Stack is the largest open API in the world. Since its deployment, India has been organizing hackathons to develop applications for the APIs.

India Stack is being implemented in stages, starting with the introduction in 2009 of the Aadhaar "Universal ID" numbers. These are linked to biometrics (fingerprints) and as time goes by, authentication by Aadhaar is required for access to more and more services and subsidies. This raises issues of privacy and surveillance, especially as much of the users' interface is via their mobile phones.

The next stages were the introduction of eKYC (electronic Know Your Customer), which enables paperless and rapid verification of address, identity etc., followed by e-Sign, whereby users attach a legally valid electronic signature to a document, and UPI (Unified Payments Interface) enabling cashless payments, and most recently, DigitalLocker, a platform for issuance and verification of documents & certificates.

What raised the profile of Aadhaar and India Stack worldwide was the recent demonetisation whereby 500 and 1000 Rupee notes were phased out, officially to eliminate forgeries and money-laundering, but with the secondary objective of hastening the transition to a cashless economy.

Observers have argued that India Stack could fast-track the move to digital payment systems across the developed world and mark the end of cash. However, various challenges related to user rights have been mounted: in August 2017 India's Supreme Court unanimously ruled in favour of a petition applying for privacy to be declared a fundamental right and other court matters followed.

First pilot of India Stack 

To test all 4 layers- Presenceless, paperless, cashless and consent- of India stack, the India Stack team partnered with the largest FinTech alternative credit company in India, Capital Float in 2016. The objective of the pilot was to provide loans to customers in a  few minutes and in the comfort of their own house. Additionally, the target customer was someone with no collateral and limited data trail. When a user opened the application, he/ she had to give consent for Capital Float to access his/ her data through the digital platform (Consent). Once the consent was given Capital Float used the Aadhaar infrastructure to authenticate the users (presenceless). The Aadhaar also helped with e-KYC, a mandatory requirement for all loan activities in India. Once the authentication was complete, Capital Float pinged the Aadhaar data base to check for banking activity, and also used a mobile scraping technique to gather data from the customer's phone. These two steps helped Capital Float estimate the credit-worthiness of the customer. Once this was determined, the customer of the application saw loan offers on the screen. The customer could then select the offer and do an e-signature within the comforts of their home (paperless). This whole process could be completed in 45 seconds. Once the loan was approved it could directly be disbursed into the bank account of the customer (Cashless). The pull function of the UPI platform could also be utilized by Capital Float to get back the loan payments. 
 
After the Pilot, the India Stack team has approached other alternate lenders to utilize the platform to give loans to under-served populations. Capital Float is already in the process of expanding the pilot in to a full-fledged service offering.  This pilot proved a clear value proposition of the India Stack platform for the FinTech industry.

See also 

 Aadhaar
 Unified Payments Interface
 Payment gateway
 Merchant account
 Immediate Payment Service
 National Payments Corporation of India

References

Application programming interfaces
Public services of India
Financial services in India
E-government in India
Projects in Asia
Biometrics
Monetary reform
National identification numbers
Software projects